The Route Napoléon is the route taken by Napoléon in 1815 on his return from Elba. It is now concurrent with sections of routes N85, D1085, D4085, and D6085.

The route begins at Golfe-Juan, where Napoleon disembarked 1 March 1815, beginning the Hundred Days that ended at Waterloo. The road was inaugurated in 1932 and meanders from the French Riviera north-northwest along the foothills of the Alps. It is marked along the way by statues of the French Imperial Eagle.

Route
From south to north:
Antibes
Grasse
Saint-Vallier-de-Thiey
Castellane
Digne
Sisteron
Gap
Col Bayard (1,246 m)
Corps
La Mure
Laffrey
Grenoble

Gallery

External links

Roads in France
1815 in France
Alpes-Maritimes
Alpes-de-Haute-Provence
Hautes-Alpes
Isère
Hundred Days
History of Provence-Alpes-Côte d'Azur
Napoleon